Acta Cardiologica is a bimonthly peer-reviewed medical journal covering research on all aspects of cardiovascular disease including observational studies, clinical trials, experimental investigations with clear clinical relevance, and tutorials.

According to the Journal Citation Reports, the journal has a 2020 impact factor of 1.718. According to the SCImago Journal Rank (SJR), the journal h-index is 41, ranking it to Q3 in Cardiology and Cardiovascular Medicine and Medicine (miscellaneous).

References

External links
 

Cardiology journals
Bimonthly journals
English-language journals
Publications established in 1934